Warm Nights is the fourth album by Robert Forster.  It was released on LP and CD by Beggars Banquet in 1996 and was highlighted with a new version of the Go-Betweens' "Rock 'n' Roll Friend", which was a single B-side in 1988.

Forster later said, "It was about sweaty Brisbane nights, banana trees in the backyard, animals walking around at night, fruitbats flying in the air. I was looking at Brisbane with new eyes in this new suburb, and I was listening to this music that had more space, more rhythm. I wrote all the songs in about eight months, quicker than I had written since the late 70s."

Track listing
All songs written by Robert Forster, except where noted.
Side one
"I Can Do" – 3:00
"Warm Nights" – 4:25
"Cryin' Love" – 5:28
"Snake Skin Lady" – 3:35
"Loneliness" – 3:21
Side two
"Jug of Wine" – 6:03
"Fortress" – 4:57
"Rock 'n' Roll Friend" (Forster, Grant McLennan) – 5:13
"On a Street Corner" – 5:29
"I'll Jump" – 3:01

Personnel
Robert Forster – vocals, guitar
Edwyn Collins – guitar
Martin Drover – trumpet, flugelhorn
Clare Kenny – bass
Oliver Karus – cell
Neil Pentelow – saxophone
Dave Ruffy – drums
J. Neil Sidwell – trombone

References

1996 albums
Robert Forster (musician) albums
Beggars Banquet Records albums